Tzvika Tzemah is an Israeli football coach. He had coached three clubs: Hapoel Nir Ramat HaSharon F.C. (2004-08), Hapoel Ra'anana A.F.C. (2010), and Hapoel Ramat Gan Givatayim F.C. (2010-11).

References

Israeli football managers
Israeli Jews
Living people
Place of birth missing (living people)
Year of birth missing (living people)
Hapoel Ra'anana A.F.C. managers